Elbasan  Street is a major street of Tirana, Albania. It is the most important street of southern Tirana leading to national road SH3 and European Route E852. It eventually leads to Elbasan. The US Embassy in Tirana and the Jordan Misja Artistic Lyceum are located on Elbasan Street.

References

Streets in Tirana